The Allied sovereigns' visit to England occurred in June 1814 to celebrate the peace following the defeat of France and abdication of Napoleon Bonaparte in April 1814.  The sovereigns and generals of the Coalition Allies – comprising Austria, Prussia, Russia, Sweden, the United Kingdom, and a number of German States – took part in a state visit and various peace celebrations in London before progressing to the Congress of Vienna later that year.

Official dignitaries
A number of nobles, sovereigns and dignitaries attended the celebrations.  These included Tsar Alexander of Russia (who stayed with his sister, the Grand Duchess of Oldenburg at the Pulteney Hotel in Piccadilly); King Frederick William III of Prussia; Prince Metternich, Chancellor of the Austrian Empire; Field Marshal Blücher, Prince Hardenberg, the Chancellor of Prussia; General Yorck; General Bülow; Count Barclay de Tolly.

Events

Boarding the Duke of Clarence's flagship the Impregnable in Boulogne on 6 June 1814, they crossed to Dover, where they were officially welcomed, with a guard of honour provided by the soldiers of the famous Light Division - the 43rd, 52nd and 95th Regiments.  They arrived in London on the afternoon of 7 June.

Various entertainments, parades and ceremonies were undertaken, including Tsar Alexander's levee on 8 June, at the house of the Duke of Cumberland, followed by the Queen's court at the palace in the evening.  On 9 June, court was held at Carlton House, followed by a ceremony where the Emperor of Russia, the Earl of Liverpool, and Viscount Castlereagh were admitted as Knights of the Order of the Garter.

The 10 June saw the monarchs attend the races at Ascot.  Over the course of the next few days, they visited Oxford – where Tsar Alexander, King Frederick William and Marshal Blucher received honorary degrees –  Woolwich Royal Arsenal, and a City of London banquet at the Guildhall on 18 June.  One event alone cost £25,000.

On 22 June they attended a naval review at Portsmouth with the Prince Regent before embarking for the Continent.

Two streets in the developing suburb of Bayswater in London were named Moscow Road and St. Petersburgh Place in honour of the Tsar following the visit.

See also

Notes

References
Alison, Sir Archibald; (1860)  History of Europe from the commencement of the French Revolution to the restoration of the Bourbons in 1815, London: W Blackwood, available online
Bryant, Arthur; (1950) The Age of Elegance: 1812-1822, London: Collins
Londonderry, Marquis of; (1830) Narrative of the war in Germany and France, in 1813 and 1814, London: H. Coburn and R. Bentley, available online
Alexander Rich, Gisela Gledhill, and Dr. Jerzy Kierkuć-Bieliński; (2014) Peace Breaks Out! London and Paris in the Summer of 1814, London: Sir John Soane's Museum, in print

Napoleonic Wars
Regency London
Diplomatic visits by heads of state
Diplomatic visits to the United Kingdom
Events in London
1814 in international relations
1814 in the United Kingdom
Portsmouth
History of Dover, Kent
Military history of Dover, Kent
Government of the Russian Empire
1814 in Prussia
Austrian Empire
1814 in the Austrian Empire
1814 in the Russian Empire
1814 in Sweden
1814 in Germany
1814 in England
Royal visits
June 1814 events